Christopher John Payne is a British musician.

He is known as a member of Gary Numan's backing-band and the co-writer of Visage's 1981 synthpop hit single "Fade to Grey". Payne plays keyboards and viola and also a number of medieval instruments. He formed the band Dramatis with other members of Numan's backing-band in the early 1980s. Payne has composed music for television and films and formed the band Celtic Legend. He has composed, scored, recorded and conducted his orchestral and choral works in London and Prague.

Collaborations
Tubeway Army, Gary Numan (keyboards and viola 1979–1989)
Visage (played synthesizer/co-writer of "Fade to Grey")
Dramatis (band member 1981–1982) (2013–present)
Dead or Alive (musical director, 1985 tour)

References

English keyboardists
English violinists
English new wave musicians
British male violinists
1957 births
Living people
English songwriters
English male composers
Place of birth missing (living people)
21st-century violinists
21st-century British male musicians
British male songwriters